The 1959 New Hampshire Wildcats football team was an American football team that represented the University of New Hampshire as a member of the Yankee Conference during the 1959 NCAA College Division football season. In its 11th year under head coach Chief Boston, the team compiled a 3–3–2 record (1–2–1 against conference opponents) and tied for fourth place out of six teams in the Yankee Conference.

Schedule

References

New Hampshire
New Hampshire Wildcats football seasons
New Hampshire Wildcats football